A matagot or mandagot is, in oral traditions of southern France, a spirit in the form of an animal, frequently a black cat, though rat, fox, dog, or cow types are also said to exist. 

Matagots are generally evil, but some may prove helpful, like the "magician cat" said to bring wealth into a home if it is well fed. Traditionally, a wealth-bringing matagot must be lured with a fresh, plump chicken, then carried home by its new owner without the human once looking back. If the cat is given the first mouthful of food and drink at every meal, it will repay its owner with a solid gold coin each morning. In Gascony traditions, you must not keep the matagot all your lifelong: if the owner is dying, he will suffer a long agony, as long as he doesn't free the matagot.

Etymology
The word matagot is derived from the Spanish mata-gothos, from matar (to kill) and gothos (Goths). The Germanic Goth tribes settled in Spain, Southern France and Italy and eventually converted to Christianity, so Goth means "Christian" in opposition with Moro which means "Muslim". Hence a matagot would be an evil spirit who kills Christians.

Another form is magot, and this word designs a bunch of money, a treasure, so the people who became rich were supposed to have a "magot" in their home.

In popular culture 
In Kelley Armstrong's Cainsville series  novel Omens, the protagonist Olivia is adopted by an unusually intelligent black stray she dubs "The Cat" or "T.C." for short; he is addressed respectfully person-to-cat as "matagot" by village elder Veronica in private, and at points demonstrates supernatural powers such as the ability to project an image of himself across town when he needs somebody to come to his aid.   In The Screams of Dragons, a short story prequel to Omens, an endangered newborn black kitten is dubbed "Matagot" by his young rescuers, psychic Rose & animal communicator Hannah, as they feel he's "a spirit that's taken the form of a black cat." Later in the story, an adult Matagot risks his life to lure a homicidal young man into exposing his twisted nature to the village elders before further harm can be done to others.

In the 2018 fantasy film Fantastic Beasts: The Crimes of Grindelwald, matagots are portrayed as large dog-sized hairless black cat-like creatures with enormous eyes that guard the French Ministry of Magic and can multiply if attacked.

In the anti-colonial actual play podcast Campaign: Skyjacks, Travis Matagot is a changeling who can take the form of a raven, a rabbit, a snake, or a coyote depending on what season it is.

References 

French folklore
French legendary creatures
Mythological bovines
Mythological canines
Mythological felines
Mythological rodents
Cat folklore